John T. McGreevy (born 1963) is an American historian who has been serving as Charles and Jill Fischer Provost of the University of Notre Dame since July 1, 2022. He was formerly the dean of the College of Arts & Letters at the University of Notre Dame from 2008 until 2018.  McGreevy earned his Bachelor of Arts degree in history from the University of Notre Dame and his Doctor of Philosophy degree in history from Stanford University. He has been on the Notre Dame faculty since 1997. He is the author of Catholicism and American Freedom.

Books

 Parish Boundaries: The Catholic Encounter with Race in the Twentieth Century Urban North,  University of Chicago Press  1996. 
 Catholicism and American Freedom: A History, W. W. Norton  2003.
 American Jesuits and the World: How an Embattled Religious Order Made Modern Catholicism Global, Princeton University Press, 2016.
 Catholicism: A Global History from the French Revolution to Pope Francis, W. W. Norton  2022.

References

1963 births
21st-century American historians
21st-century American male writers
American historians of religion
Harvard University faculty
Historians of Jesuit history
Historians of the United States
Living people
Stanford University alumni
University of Notre Dame alumni
University of Notre Dame faculty
Writers from South Bend, Indiana